Lydia Hernandez is a Democratic member of the Arizona House of Representatives, serving since January 2023. She previously served from 2013-2014. Hernandez opposes a woman's right to choose. In 2014, Hernandez was endorsed by Arizona Right to Life, an organization that opposes access to safe, legal abortion. In 2013, Hernandez signed the Center for Arizona Policy's "Pro-Life Proclamation where she pledged to "make every effort to secure for preborn children at every stage of development all the rights, privileges, and immunities available to persons, citizens, and residents of this State, until the decisional interpretations of the United States Constitution by the United States Supreme Court provide protection for every human being."  Hernandez served on the Financial Institutions and Government committees.

References

External links
 
 Legislative page

Living people
Democratic Party members of the Arizona House of Representatives
Hispanic and Latino American state legislators in Arizona
Hispanic and Latino American women in politics
Year of birth missing (living people)